Chasing Comets is a 2018 Australian comedy drama film directed by Jason Perini and written by Jason Stevens and lead actors are Dan Ewing and Isabel Lucas. The film follows the on-field and off-field life of Chase who is following his dream of playing National Rugby League (NRL). It is set in Wagga Wagga, New South Wales, a town divided by the Australian Football League and the NRL. The film was released to Australian theatres on 23 August 2018.

Chasing Comets was filmed in Victoria and New South Wales in 2017.

Plot
Chase (Dan Ewing) is an aspiring rugby league player for the NRL Team who experiences several life changing moments whilst in a relationship with girlfriend Brooke (Isabel Lucas). He decides to pursue his dream in remembrance of his dad. Along the way, Chase discovers that his teammates Munsey (John Batchelor), Rhys Stewart (Stan Walker), Tom (Beau Ryan), and Rev (George Houvardas) want him to achieve his goals as the pressures of the game's first league match is just weeks away. However, he struggles to keep up resulting in Brooke dumping him and the team dropping him off the team's charts.

Cast
Dan Ewing as Chase
Isabel Lucas as Brooke
George Houvardas as The Rev
John Batchelor as Coach Munsey
Stan Walker as Rhys Stewart
Kat Hoyos as Dee
Beau Ryan as Tom
Rhys Muldoon as Warren Low
Justin Melvey as Sam Low
DJ Havana Brown as herself - DJ
Katrina Risteska as April
Lance Bonza as Rusty
Deborah Galanos as Mary
Brenton Parkes as Actor
Tony Chu as Kin
Gary Eck as Kev Mcosker
Courtney Powell as Supporter
Sarah Furnari as Estelle
David Thacker as himself - Host
Ash Meeraiya as Comet
Daniel Needs as Comets Player #2
Richard Somerton as Comets Player #3
Jason Stevens as NRL Scout (Cowboys)
Matthew Mannes as Comets Assistant Coach

Production and release
It was filmed in Sydney and Wagga Wagga. Production completed in 2017. The film is scheduled to release on August 23, 2018, to Australian and New Zealand theatres.

References

External links

2010s sports comedy-drama films
Australian sports comedy-drama films
Rugby league films
Australian rules football films
2010s English-language films
2010s Australian films